Aschenbach may refer to:

People 
 Hans-Georg Aschenbach (born 1951), German former ski jumper
 Lawson Aschenbach (born 1983), American professional racing driver
 Thomas J. Aschenbach (born 1972), American artist known for his "UFO" comic strip
 Gustav von Aschenbach, main character in Thomas Mann's 1912 novella Death in Venice

Other uses 
 Aschenbach (Mühlbach), a river in Germany

See also
 Aschbach (disambiguation)